Shawn Holman (born November 19, 1964) is a former baseball pitcher who appeared in five games for the Detroit Tigers in 1989.

References

External links

1964 births
Living people
Albuquerque Dukes players
American expatriate baseball players in Canada
Baseball players from Pennsylvania
Carolina Mudcats players
Detroit Tigers players
Glens Falls Tigers players
Greenwood Pirates players
Gulf Coast Pirates players
Harrisburg Senators players
London Tigers players
Macon Pirates players
Nashua Pirates players
Major League Baseball pitchers
Ottawa Lynx players
People from Sewickley, Pennsylvania
Prince William Pirates players
Richmond Braves players
Toledo Mud Hens players
American expatriate baseball players in Mexico
Tecolotes de los Dos Laredos players
Diablos Rojos del México players

http://www.timesonline.com/3e6fd820-2c5d-11e7-beb2-9f7cf8058885.html